Sonia Oback is an American comic book colorist who is best known for her work on the Top Cow Productions series Witchblade.

Career

Oback started on Witchblade with issue #75, in a back-up story assisting Brian Buccellato. In 2006, she worked on X23: Target X.

In 2010, Oback worked on a pictorial featuring comedic actress Olivia Munn in the April/May 2010 issue of Complex magazine, and on its cover. The pictorial featured Munn interacting with illustrated animals in a forest setting, drawn by Mike Choi and colored by Oback.

Bibliography

Interior art
 City of Heroes #1-11
 The Darkness VOL 2 #19-24
 The Gift #11-14
 KM3 Studios 2006 Sketchbook
 Witchblade #75-76, 92-101
 X23: Target X #1-6

Cover art
 Battle of the Planets: Princess #2-4
 Helios #3
 KM3 Studios 2006 Sketchbook
 Vampirella Jay Company Wizard World Exclusive Cover
 Witchblade #97, 100-101
 Witchblade #80 Holiday eBay Exclusive
 Witchblade #83 WWLA Exclusive,
 X23: Target X #1-6
 X23: Target X #1 Top Cow Exclusive Cover

References

External links

 

American female comics artists
Comics colorists
Living people
Year of birth missing (living people)